Connor Taylor (born 25 October 2001) is an English professional footballer who plays as a defender for  club Stoke City.

Taylor spent his youth at Port Vale's academy and Stafford Rangers, before signing a one-year scholarship with Stoke City in September 2019. He went on to spend brief spells on loan at non-League clubs Ashton United and Chester. He spent the 2021–22 season on loan at Bristol Rovers and won the club's Young Player of the Year award after helping Rovers to win promotion out of League Two.

Career

Stoke City
Taylor started his career at Port Vale's academy, before going on to join Stafford Rangers. He made a number of substitute appearances for Stafford in the 2018–19 season and represented England Schoolboys. In September 2019 Taylor signed a one-year scholarship with Stoke City and joined their U23 squad. In October 2020, Taylor spent time at Ashton United on work experience, playing in an FA Trophy game against Clitheroe and a Northern Premier League Premier Division match with Whitby Town. Taylor joined National League North side Chester on a one-month loan deal on 18 December 2020. Anthony Johnson, joint-manager of the "Blues", said that "he has looked like a 30-year-old centre back who has been playing for 12 years not someone that has just been dropped in for their debut". The loan was extended until the end of January 2021. Taylor signed a new 18-month contract with Stoke in February 2021. Taylor made his senior debut for the "Potters" on 21 April 2021, coming on as a 17th-minute substitute for James Chester in a 3–2 defeat to Coventry City at the Bet365 Stadium.

On 17 June 2021, Taylor joined Bristol Rovers on loan for the 2021–22 season. Taylor contracted COVID-19 and the "Pirates" got off to a poor start to the campaign, but manager Joey Barton described Taylor as a "colossus" after Rovers picked up their first League Two win of the season in a 1–0 win over Crawley Town at the Memorial Stadium on 4 September. On 25 September 2021, Taylor scored a first career goal as he equalised with ten minutes to go as Rovers got a last-minute comeback victory at Walsall, the club's first away win in nine months. Taylor's impressive early-season form continued and on 12 November, he was awarded the EFL Young Player of the Month Award. This came after two clean sheets in six matches and an impressive man-of-the-match performance as Rovers defeated high-flying Harrogate Town, Taylor winning thirteen aerial duels. In February 2022 it was revealed by Barton that Taylor will undergo heart surgery at the end of the 2021–22 season after feeling unwell in a warm-up against Oldham. In April 2022, Taylor was nominated for the League Two Young Player of the Season Award, facing competition from Leyton Orient's Shadrach Ogie and Newport County's Finn Azaz, missing out on the award to the latter. On 7 May 2022, Taylor scored the second goal in a final day 7–0 thrashing of Scunthorpe United that saw Rovers overtake Northampton Town into the final automatic promotion place on goals scored. The following day at the end of season awards, Taylor was named as the Bristol Rovers Young Player of the Season.

On 14 July 2022, Taylor signed a new three-year contract with Stoke.

Style of play
Taylor is a big, quick centre-back who is comfortable on the ball.

Career statistics

Honours
Bristol Rovers
EFL League Two third-place promotion: 2021–22

Individual
EFL Young Player of the Month: October 2021
Bristol Rovers Young Player of the Year: 2021–22

References

2001 births
Living people
English footballers
England schools international footballers
Association football defenders
Port Vale F.C. players
Stafford Rangers F.C. players
Stoke City F.C. players
Ashton United F.C. players
Chester F.C. players
Bristol Rovers F.C. players
Northern Premier League players
National League (English football) players
English Football League players